Fuchsia boliviana is a species of Fuchsia native to southern Peru, Bolivia and northern Argentina.

Description
It is a medium evergreen shrub, growing to 2–4 m tall, rarely to 6 m, with a spreading, open habit. It has large, hairy mid-green leaves and red petioles. It has large drooping corymbs up to 20 cm long borne in late summer and autumn of scarlet red flowers with the individual flowers 3–7 cm long. A white-flowering form exists named 'Alba', with a white tube and scarlet petals.  After flowering it bears small red-purple, edible fruit 10–26 mm long.

Fuchsia boliviana is widely grown in shade or part-shade in cooler, subtropical climates. Plants require protection from direct sun and temperatures exceeding 40 °C. The plants are hardy to about -4 °C for short periods. Propagation is by seed or cuttings.

References

boliviana
Flora of Argentina
Flora of Bolivia
Flora of Peru
Plants described in 1876
Taxa named by Élie-Abel Carrière